Rocky Cape is a locality and small rural community in the local government areas of Circular Head and Waratah-Wynyard, in the North-west and west region of Tasmania. The Bass Highway passes through from south-east to north-west. The Rocky Cape National Park is in the north-east of the locality. The 2016 census determined a population of 206 for the state suburb of Rocky Cape.

History
The Detention River flows through the locality, which was previously known as “Detention”.

Road infrastructure
The C227 route (Rocky Cape Road) terminates at the Bass Highway in Rocky Cape. It runs north-east to the promontory “Rocky Cape”, within the national park.

See also
 Detention River Christian Community
 Banksia Grove (Tasmania)
 Genoplesium brachystachyum (Rocky Cape midge orchid)

References

Localities of Circular Head Council
Localities of Waratah–Wynyard Council
Towns in Tasmania